
This is a list of the National Register of Historic Places listings in Downtown Denver, Colorado.

This is intended to be a complete list of the properties and districts on the National Register of Historic Places in downtown Denver, Colorado, United States. Downtown Denver is defined as being the neighborhoods of Capitol Hill, Central Business District, Civic Center, Five Points, North Capitol Hill, and Union Station. The locations of National Register properties and districts may be seen in an online map.

There are 306 properties and districts listed on the National Register in Denver, including 1 National Historic Landmark. Downtown Denver includes 149 of these properties and districts, including the National Historic Landmark and 2 that extend into other regions; the city's remaining properties and districts are listed elsewhere. Another 7 properties in downtown Denver were once listed but have been removed.

Current listings

|}

Former listings

|}

See also
List of National Historic Landmarks in Colorado
National Register of Historic Places listings in Denver, Colorado

References

Downtown